Wren Day, also known as Wren's Day, Day of the Wren, or Hunt the Wren Day, is an Irish celebration held on 26 December, St. Stephen's Day in a number of countries across Europe. The tradition consists of "hunting" a wren (now a fake wren but previously a real one) and putting it on top of a decorated pole. Then the crowds of mummers, or strawboys, celebrate the wren (also pronounced wran) by dressing up in masks, straw suits, and colourful motley clothing. They form music bands and parade through towns and villages. These crowds are sometimes called the wrenboys.

The tradition is closely related to Hunt the Wren on the Isle of Man, and versions may have been practised across the Anglo, Celtic Isles.

Traditional ceremony

Wren 
In past times and into the 20th century, an actual bird was hunted by wrenboys on St. Stephen's Day. The captured wren was tied to the wrenboy leader's staff, a net attached to a pitchfork or a holly bush, which was decorated with coloured paper and ribbons. It would sometimes be kept alive, as the popular mummers' parade song states, "A penny or tuppence would do it no harm".

Activities and costumes 

Wrenboys would go from house to house in the countryside collecting money but in the towns the groups were more organised and there was often an element of faction-fighting. In both cases there would be a Wren Captain (usually wearing a cape and carrying a sword), musicians, and people wearing disguises including straw costumes (worn by "strawboys"), blackened faces, and dressed as old women. It is a day of wild revelry and people usually use their disguises to play tricks on their friends. This behaviour is reminiscent of the skekling tradition on the Shetland Islands. The money collected from the townspeople is usually donated to a school or charity, or used to host a dance or "Wren Ball" for the town on a night in January. Often the boys gave a feather from the bird to patrons for good luck. In recent times, the bands of young boys have been expanded to include girls and adults.

Song 

Whilst going from house to house, the Wrenboys would sing a song, of which there are many variations, asking for donations from the townspeople. One variation sung in Edmondstown, County Dublin ran as such (the last two lines of which are used in several festive British begging songs and rhymes including Christmas is Coming):The wren the wren the king of all birds

St Stephen's Day was caught in the furze

Her clothes were all torn- her shoes were all worn

Up with the kettle and down with the pan

Give us a penny to bury the "wran"

If you haven't a penny, a halfpenny will do

If you haven't a halfpenny, God bless you!In a 1978 recording, the sean-nós singer Seosamh Ó hÉanaí discusses Wren Day activities and the lore behind the tradition. He sings a macaronic English-Irish text, "Dreoilín, dreoilín, Rí na nÉan (Wren, wren, King of Birds)"

Origin

The Celtic theory 
The wren celebration may have descended from Celtic mythology. Ultimately, the origin may be a Samhain or midwinter sacrifice or celebration, as Celtic mythology considered the wren a symbol of the past year (the European wren is known for its habit of singing even in mid-winter, and its name in the Netherlands, "winter king," reflects this); Celtic names of the wren (draouennig, drean, dreathan, dryw etc.) also suggest an association with druidic rituals.

Lleu Llaw Gyffes, a Welsh hero, wins his name by hitting or killing a wren. He strikes a wren "between the tendon and the bone of its leg", causing Arianrhod, his mother, to say "it is with a skillful hand that the fair-haired one has hit it". At that Gwydion, his foster father, reveals himself, saying Lleu Llaw Gyffes; "the fair-haired one with the skillful hand" is his name now".

In the Isle of Man, the hunting of the wren (shelg yn drean) is associated with an ancient enchantress or 'queen of the fairies' (or goddess) named 'Tehi Tegi' which translates to something like 'beautiful gatherer' in Brythonic (the Manx spoke Brythonic before they switched to Gaelic). Tehi Tegi was so beautiful that all the men of the Island followed her around in hope of marrying her, and neglected their homes and fields. Tehi Tegi led her suitors to the river and then drowned them. She was confronted, but turned into a wren and escaped. She was banished from the Island but returns once a year, when she is hunted.

The Christian theory 
The myth most commonly told in Ireland to explain the festival is as follows; God wished to know who was the king of all birds so he set a challenge. The bird who flew highest and furthest would win. The birds all began together but they dropped out one by one until none were left but the great eagle. The eagle eventually grew tired and began to drop lower in the sky. At this point, the treacherous wren emerged from beneath the eagle's wing to soar higher and further than all the others. This belief is shown in the song that begins:

"The wren, the wren, the King of All Birds,
St. Stephen's Night got caught in the furze."

This also illustrates the tradition of hunting the wren on Christmas Day (St. Stephen's Eve/Night).

The Norse theory 
The tradition may also have been influenced by Scandinavian settlers during the Viking invasions of the 8th to 10th centuries though it is usually attributed to the "Christianising" of old pagan festivals by saints to ease the transition and promote conversion.Various associated legends exist, such as a wren being responsible for betraying Irish soldiers who fought the Viking invaders by beating its wings on their shields, in the late 1st and early 2nd millennia, and for betraying the Christian martyr Saint Stephen, after whom the day is named. This mythological association with treachery is a possible reason the bird was hunted by wrenboys on St. Stephen's Day, or why a pagan sacrificial tradition was continued into Christian times. Despite the abandonment of killing the wren, devoted wrenboys continue to ensure that the Gaelic tradition of celebrating the wren continues, although it is no longer widespread.

Parallel traditions

England 
The custom was probably historically performed in England. It has been revived in Suffolk by Pete Jennings and the Old Glory Molly Dancers and has been performed in the village of Middleton every Boxing Day evening since 1994.

Wales 
Similar traditions of hunting the wren have been performed in Pembrokeshire, Wales on Twelfth Day (6 January).

Isle of Man 
A tradition of Hunting the Wren happens on the Isle of Man every St Stephen's Day (26 December) at various locations around the Island. This is a circle dance, music and song, taken around the streets. A stuffed wren or substitute is placed at the centre of a tall hooped pole decorated with ribbons and greenery. Then a lively circle dance takes place around it, to live musicians playing the tune, and from time to time the song is sung. The words of the song on the Island are similar to the Dublin variation and the North Wales version.

Spain
In Galicia, Spain, the Caceria do rei Charlo (Chase of King Charles) was performed. The inhabitants of Vilanova de Lourenzá would chase down a wren and, after tying it to a pole, would parade it and show it to the abbot of the local monastery, who would then offer them food and drink and appoint two leaders of the local town council out of the four candidates proposed by townsmen. This tradition has been recorded since the 16th century. The sources are somewhat misleading about the day, since they call it "New Year's Day" but might mean "The day after Christmas", which was regarded then as the end of the year.

France
A similar tradition is performed on the first Sunday of December in parts of Southern France, including Carcassonne. James George Frazer describes in his The Golden Bough a wren-hunting ritual in Carcassonne. The Fête du Roi de l'Oiseau, first recorded in 1524 at Puy-en-Velay, is still active.

Popular songs 
In 1955 Liam Clancy recorded "The Wran Song" ("The Wren Song"), which was sung in Ireland by wrenboys. In 1972 Steeleye Span recorded "The King" on Please to See the King, which also reflects the tradition. They made another version, "The Cutty Wren", on their album Time. "Hunting the Wren" is on John Kirkpatrick's album Wassail!. The Chieftains made a collection of wrenboy tunes on The Bells of Dublin. In the song "The Boys of Barr na Sráide", which is based on a poem by Sigerson Clifford, the wren hunt is also prominent. Lankum's 2019 album The Livelong Day includes a track called "Hunting the Wren" that references several of the legends and practices connected with Wren Day.

"The Wren [Wran] Song" is also on the Clancy Brothers and Tommy Makem's 1995 album Ain't It Grand Boys: A Collection of Unissued Gems, as the last song in "Children's Medley". The spoken introduction tells how as boys they would go out on Christmas Day and kill a wren, and on the next day, St. Stephen's Day, they would go from house to house singing this song and asking for money "to bury the wren".

See also 
St. Stephen's Day
Junkanoo
Cutty Wren
Mummer's Day

References

External links 
 Archived audio recording of The Wren Song, sung by Will Murphy, Colliers, Newfoundland
 Discussions about the Wren song
 Hunt the Wren in the Isle of Man
 Handbook of Birds of the World: Wrens family account
 Hunting the Wren on the Dingle peninsula - An excellent account of the origins, history, contemporary aspects and international connections of the wren.
 The Weird Side of St. Stephen's day in Ireland & Elsewhere (Fustar.info)
 Wren Boy Festival
 Wren Day
 Wren Day Songs
 Hunting the Wren, bbc.co.uk, 23 Dec 2005

Irish mythology
December observances
Irish folklore
International observances
Public holidays in the United Kingdom
Irish culture
Winter events in the Republic of Ireland